Andrzejów may refer to the following places:
Andrzejów, Bełchatów County in Łódź Voivodeship (central Poland)
Andrzejów, Chełm County in Lublin Voivodeship (east Poland)
Andrzejów, Janów Lubelski County in Lublin Voivodeship (east Poland)
Andrzejów, Wieruszów County in Łódź Voivodeship (central Poland)
Andrzejów, Zduńska Wola County in Łódź Voivodeship (central Poland)
Andrzejów, Włodawa County in Lublin Voivodeship (east Poland)
Andrzejów, Sochaczew County in Masovian Voivodeship (east-central Poland)
Andrzejów, Zwoleń County in Masovian Voivodeship (east-central Poland)